Pontotoc County is in the south central part of Oklahoma. As of the 2010 census, the population was 37,492. Its county seat is Ada. The county was created at statehood from part of the Chickasaw Nation in Indian Territory. It was named for a historic Chickasaw tribal area in Mississippi. According to the Encyclopedia of Oklahoma History and Culture, Pontotoc is usually translated "cattail prairie" or "land of hanging grapes."

Pontotoc County comprises the Ada, OK Micropolitan Statistical Area.

The Chickasaw Nation's headquarters are in Ada.

History
The present Pontotoc County was part of the land that the U.S. government granted in 1830 to the Choctaw tribe via the Treaty of Dancing Rabbit Creek. In 1837, the Chickasaw tribe was  granted land within the Choctaw domain. In 1857, the Chickasaw Nation formed its own government on this land. However, few Chickasaw settled there until after the Civil War, mainly because of attacks by various Plains Indian tribes.

The first settlers were located in the vicinity of Boggy Depot during the 1840s. Camp Arbuckle was established to protect migrants traveling on the California Road. After the Civil War, settlements began spreading through the area. Some of the new settlers were illegal white intruders and outlaws. The first post office was established at Stonewall in 1878. The town of Ada was founded in 1890. After three railroads built lines through Ada, it became the dominant community of the area. Ada was named county seat when Pontotoc County was created.

Geography
The Canadian River forms the northern boundary.

Adjacent counties

 Seminole County (north)
 Hughes County (northeast)
 Coal County (southeast)
 Johnston County (south)
 Murray County (southwest)
 Garvin County (west)
 McClain County (northwest)
 Pottawatomie County (northwest)

Demographics

As of the 2010 United States Census, there were 37,492 people living in the county. 71.2% were White, 17.4% Native American, 2.4% Black or African American, 0.7% Asian, 1.1% of some other race and 7.2% of two or more races. 4.1% were Hispanic or Latino (of any race).

As of the census of 2000, there were 35,143 people, 13,978 households, and 9,421 families living in the county.  The population density was 19/km2 (49/mi2).  There were 15,575 housing units at an average density of 8/km2 (22/mi2).  The racial makeup of the county was 75.80% White, 2.06% Black or African American, 15.51% Native American, 0.46% Asian, 0.02% Pacific Islander, 0.79% from other races, and 5.36% from two or more races.  2.30% of the population were Hispanic or Latino of any race.

There were 13,978 households, out of which 30.80% had children under the age of 18 living with them, 52.90% were married couples living together, 10.80% had a female householder with no husband present, and 32.60% were non-families. 28.10% of all households were made up of individuals, and 12.30% had someone living alone who was 65 years of age or older.  The average household size was 2.44 and the average family size was 2.98.

In the county, the population was spread out, with 24.70% under the age of 18, 12.50% from 18 to 24, 26.00% from 25 to 44, 21.90% from 45 to 64, and 15.00% who were 65 years of age or older.  The median age was 36 years. For every 100 females there were 93.30 males.  For every 100 females age 18 and over, there were 90.60 males.

The median income for a household in the county was $26,955, and the median income for a family was $35,400. Males had a median income of $26,785 versus $18,939 for females. The per capita income for the county was $14,664.  About 11.80% of families and 16.50% of the population were below the poverty line, including 20.10% of those under age 18 and 11.70% of those age 65 or over.

Politics

Economy
Cattle ranching was one of the most important economic activities in this area up through the territorial period. Agriculture rose to prominence in the early 20th century, with cotton being the most important crop. Cattle raising reemerged as the major industry, and the county is sometimes called "Hereford Heaven."

Other important economic activities include limestone quarrying, cement production, light manufacturing, services and government.  The city of Ada is the headquarters of the Chickasaw Nation, and the base of the Carl Albert Indian Health System.

Communities

City
 Ada (county seat)

Towns
 Allen
 Byng
 Fitzhugh
 Francis
 Roff
 Stonewall

Census-designated places
 Fittstown
 Latta
 Pickett
 Vanoss

Other unincorporated places
 Gaar Corner
 Happyland
 Harden City
 Jesse

NRHP sites

The following sites in Pontotoc County are listed on the National Register of Historic Places:
 Ada Public Library, Ada
 Bebee Field Round House, Ada
 East Central State Normal School, Ada
 F.W. Meaders House, Ada
 Mijo Camp Industrial District, Ada
 Pontotoc County Courthouse, Ada
 Roff Armory, Roff
 Sugg Clinic, Ada
 Wintersmith Park Historic District, Ada

See also
 Chimney Hill (Oklahoma) 
 Gladys Love Smith Presley (Elvis mom) was born on April 25, 1912 in Pontotoc County, Mississippi, USA

References

 
1907 establishments in Oklahoma
Populated places established in 1907